Sawyers is a surname. Notable people with the surname include:

 Jazmin Sawyers, (born 1994) British long jumper
 Philip Sawyers (born 1951), British composer
 Riley Ann Sawyers (2005–2007), American murder victim
 Rodney Sawyers (born 1967), American racecar driver
 Shawn Sawyers (born 1976), Jamaican professional football player

See also

 Sawyer's, defunct manufacturing and retail company
 Genus Monochamus, commonly called sawyer beetles
 Sawyer (disambiguation)